National Route 47 is a national highway in South Korea connects Ansan to Cheorwon County. It established on 14 March 1981.

Main stopovers

 Gyeonggi Province
 Ansan (Sangnok District) - Gunpo - Ansan - Gunpo - Anyang (Dongan District) - Uiwang - Anyang - Gwacheon
 Seoul
 Seocho District - Gangnam District - Yeongdong Bridge - Gwangjin District - Jungnang District
 Gyeonggi Province
 Guri - Namyangju - Pocheon - Gapyeong - Pocheon
 Gangwon Province
 Cheorwon County

Major intersections

 (■): Motorway
IS: Intersection, IC: Interchange

Gyeonggi Province (South of Seoul)

Seoul

Gyeonggi Province (North of Seoul)

Gangwon Province

References

47
Roads in Seoul
Roads in Gyeonggi
Roads in Gangwon